The 1974–75 New York Nets season was the eighth season of the franchise in the American Basketball Association.

ABA Draft

Roster

Playoffs

Two days before the Semifinals began, the Nets and Colonels had a Tiebreaker game played to settle who would be the Eastern Division Champion and play the Memphis Sounds. Julius Erving scored 34 points for the Nets but Artis Gilmore grabbed 33 rebounds for Kentucky. The Colonels won the game 108-99 in Kentucky, thus the Nets were slated to play the Spirits.

Eastern Division Semifinals vs. Spirits of St. Louis

References

New York Nets season
New Jersey Nets seasons
New York Nets
New York Nets
Sports in Hempstead, New York